Americo-Liberian people or Congo people or Congau people in Liberian English, are a Liberian ethnic group of African American, Afro-Caribbean, and liberated African descent. The sister ethnic group of Americo-Liberians are the Sierra Leone Creole people, who share similar ancestry and related culture. Americo-Liberians trace their ancestry to free-born and formerly enslaved African Americans who emigrated in the 19th century to become the founders of the state of Liberia. They identified there as Americo-Liberians. Some African Americans following resettlement in Canada also participated as founding settlers in Sierra Leone and other Recaptive repatriates settled in present-day Côte d'Ivoire.

Although the terms "Americo-Liberian" and "Congo" had distinct definitions in the nineteenth century, they are currently interchangeable and refer to an ethnic group composed of the descendants of the various free and ex-slave African American, Caribbean, recaptive, and Sierra Leone Creoles who settled in Liberia from 1822.

The designation "Congo" for the Americo-Liberian population came into common usage when these African Americans integrated 5,000 liberated Africans called Congos (former slaves from the Congo Basin, who were freed by British and Americans from slave ships after the prohibition of the African slave trade) and 500 Barbadian immigrants into the Americo-Liberian identity. Under Americo-Liberian leadership, the country was relatively stable although they rarely intermarried with indigenous West Africans.

Although Western literature and discourse in the United States and United Kingdom use the term "Americo-Liberians", this term is largely outdated. In common parlance, many Liberians and other West Africans, including the Americo-Liberian people themselves, refer to the group as "Congo" or "Congau" people.

In addition to indigenous Liberian chiefs and royal families, upper class Americo-Liberians and their descendants led the political, social, cultural and economic sectors of the country; alongside indigenous Liberian elites, upper class Americo-Liberians ruled the new nation from the 19th century until 1980 as a small but dominant minority. From 1878 to 1980, the Republic of Liberia was a de facto one-party state, ruled by elites of both the indigenous and Americo-Liberian-dominated True Whig Party and Masonic Order of Liberia.

History and settlement
Americo-Liberians were descended from African American and Afro-Caribbean settlers, many of whom were freed slaves and their descendants who emigrated to Liberia with assistance from the American Colonization Society (ACS). The first black American settlers arrived in Liberia in 1822. The ACS's plan of encouraging black American migration to Africa was met with mixed responses at the time. Some members of the abolitionist movement, such as Gerrit Smith, opposed the idea, arguing that African-American families had lived in the United States for generations, and their prevailing sentiment was that they were no more African than white Americans were European. Other historians have argued that white Americans encouraged the emigration of people of color to Africa due to their opposition to integration. Additionally, some slave owners manumitted some of their slaves on the condition of emigration. However, other African Americans believed they would face better economic opportunities in Africa and be free from racial prejudice, a sentiment that was endorsed by the Back-to-Africa movement. As black American emigration to Liberia continued steadily into the mid to late nineteenth century, the movement gained support from an assortment of influential figures, including UNIA president Marcus Garvey, who would go on to become president of the Black Star Line which encouraged emigration and economic shipping commerce between the United States and Liberia.

The early African American settlers practiced Christianity, sometimes in combination with traditional African religious beliefs. They spoke an African-American Vernacular English, which developed into Liberian English.

The early African-American settlers who arrived in the region that was established as Liberia between 1820 and 1843 were mainly free blacks from Virginia, South Carolina, and Georgia, while smaller numbers came from northern states like New Jersey, New York, Delaware, and Connecticut. Subsequent movements also included emigrants from Mississippi, Louisiana, Arkansas, Kentucky, and Florida.

The Liberian exodus saw mass emigration of African Americans from South Carolina to Liberia. Congressman Richard H. Cain called for a million men to leave the injustices they suffered in the United States and leave for Africa. In 1877, the Liberian Exodus Joint Stock Steamship Company was formed in Charleston, South Carolina with a fund of $6,000 to assist the emigration of black Americans to Africa. The company then purchased a bark called the Azor, which arrived in Charleston in March 1878 to start shipping African American migrants to Liberia. Enthusiasm for the Liberian exodus had been fed partly by exaggerated reports of Liberia's fertility, including claims that potatoes grew so large that a single one could feed a family for a day, and that certain trees produced bacon. However,  23 of the emigrants died during the journey and upon arrival, the passengers discovered that these claims were not true and many found themselves impoverished. Those who could afford it returned to the U.S. in 1879 and plans for a second voyage by the Liberian Exodus Company were scrapped. However, passengers from the Azor who stayed did find success and established themselves as some of the most prominent Americo-Liberians, including farmer and agricultural businessman Saul Hill, Liberian Senator Reverend David Frazier and Daniel Frank Tolbert who was the grandfather of future Liberian president William R. Tolbert, Jr.

Although the number of Afro-Caribbean immigrants to Liberia were relatively small in comparison to colonial Sierra Leone, at least 300 Afro-Barbadians settled in Liberia in 1865 and smaller numbers of Afro-Caribbean immigrants settled in Liberia between 1865 and 1930 from Caribbean islands such as Trinidad, Jamaica, and Grenada.

The American Navy was responsible for the recapture of illegal slave vessels seeking to transport enslaved Africans to the Americas following the American abolition of the slave trade in 1808. These enslaved Africans called Liberated Africans or Recaptives, many of whom were from the Congo Basin were designated as 'Congoes' and all Recaptives, including those from modern-day Nigeria, Cameroon, and Ghana were all described as 'Congoes.'

The early African American settlers did not relate well to the native African inhabitants they first encountered in Liberia due to cultural differences and soon began to establish a social and economic elite in the country. They retained preferences for Western style of dress, Southern plantation-style homes, American food, Protestantism, the English language, and monogamous kinship practices. Demographically, the Americo-Liberians tended to concentrate in larger cities and towns while native Africans remained in more poorly developed areas before the two groups started to intermingle in the twentieth century.

Development of society
The settler community developed an Americo-Liberian society, culture, and political organization that was strongly influenced by their roots in the American South as well as the Anglophone Caribbean.

Americo-Liberians were credited for Liberia's largest and longest economic expansion in the early to late twentieth century, especially William V. S. Tubman, who did much to promote foreign investment and to bridge the economic, social, and political gaps between the descendants of the original settlers and the inhabitants of the interior. Most of the powerful old Americo-Liberian families fled to the United States in the 1980s after President William Tolbert was assassinated in a military coup.

Although Liberianist scholars have neglected internal stratifications such as class and geography among the Americo-Liberian society, regional and local socio-economic differences among the Americo-Liberians resulted in slight cultural differences between rural 'upriver' Americo-Liberians such as those based in Clay-Ashland and city-based Americo-Liberians, particularly those based in Monrovia who were sometimes referred to 'Monrovia Americo-Liberians.' Americo-Liberians based in Monrovia were portrayed as more urbane than their rural counterparts and were perceived by some Americo-Liberians as wielding too great an influence on national political affairs.

Settlements
The Americo-Liberians settled in Monrovia, Careysburg, Clay-Ashland, Buchanan, Maryland, Mississippi-in-Africa, Cape Mount, Greenville, and in a number of small towns along the St. Paul River. Notably, the families originally from Barbados, which included the Barclays, Morgans, Bests, Thorpes, Weeks, and Portemans, settled in Crozierville.

The original "Congo people" were settled in New Georgia. Immigrants from Sierra Leone and the Gold Coast likewise settled in Monrovia.

Political developments in Liberia
 
As founders of the nation, and taking up about five percent of the Liberian population, upper-class Americo-Liberians had a leading role national politics from the founding of the colony. Following the Liberian Declaration of Independence in 1847, Americo-Liberians controlled much of Liberia's political and social institutions. Liberia was initially dominated by two political parties that were supported by Americo-Liberians, the Republican Party and the True Whig Party (TWP). After TWP candidate Anthony W. Gardiner was elected president in 1878, the TWP went on to govern Liberia for over a century, cementing Americo-Liberian political dominance. While opposition parties were never made illegal and Liberia was not classed as a dictatorship, the TWP more or less ran the country as a one party state and held a monopoly on Liberian politics. Liberian presidents from that date onwards were either of full or partial Americo-Liberian origin.

During his rule, Americo-Liberian president William Tubman was widely regarded as the father of modern Liberia. The Tubman administration embarked on a mass modernization program, including improving literacy among the population, updating the nation's infrastructure, courting close relationships with the United States and attracting foreign investment to stimulate the economy. As a result, Liberia experienced a period of rapid development and economic prosperity in the 1960s. Tubman also fought for more constitutional rights for indigenous Liberians although disparity still remained.

After coming to power, TWP Americo-Liberian president William Tolbert sought to introduce some liberal reforms including addressing imbalances between Americo-Liberians and the indigenous peoples by bringing more native figures into the government. However, these reforms proved unpopular among some of the Americo-Liberian population (including members of his cabinet) who felt Tolbert was undermining their position and accused him of "letting the peasants into the kitchen" while native Liberians felt the changes were happening too slowly. In 1980, native Liberian Samuel Doe led the 1980 Liberian coup d'état in which Tolbert was assassinated and Americo-Liberian political dominance came to an end.

There is a debate among academics about how upper-class Americo-Liberians were able exert a political power and influence greater than their population. Some academics attribute the influence of the Americo-Liberians to the consolidation of economic and social interests across the various facets of Americo-Liberian society despite the fact that some initial divisions in early Americo-Liberian society were based on state of origin in the United States, educational levels, socio-economic class, free or freedmen status, and perhaps "colorism", particularly because the first president was of mixed race, as were numerous immigrants, reflecting the nature of African-American society in the Upper South.

However, some scholars argue against the importance of colorism in early Americo-Liberian society and have noted, that during the early Republic, the Americo-Liberian political leaders had an array of skin colors and tones from very dark skin to light skinned phenotypes reflecting African-European admixture, indicating that the theory on the importance of colorism in Americo-Liberian society is unlikely to be accurate.

It is more likely that upper-class Americo-Liberians built their power on their familiarity with American culture and economics, shared lineage, and ability to create a network of shared interests. Others believe their extensive political influence was in part due to the Masonic Order of Liberia, a fraternal organization. A marble Masonic Lodge was built in 1867 as one of Monrovia's most impressive buildings. It was considered a bastion of Americo-Liberian power, and was strong enough to survive the civil war. After years of neglect after the war the Masonic order has repaired the lodge.

In 1980, a violent military coup was led by Samuel Doe. Doe's tenure as leader of Liberia led to a period of civil wars, resulting in destruction of the country's economy. In the early 21st century, Liberia has been reduced to one of the most impoverished nations in the world, in which most of the population lives below the international poverty line.

Culture
Americo-Liberian culture is a blend of the African-American and Caribbean culture brought to Liberia by the various American, Recaptive, and West Indian settlers and is exhibited by the cuisine, language, and architectural style of the Americo-Liberians.

The Americo-Liberians introduced various aspects of African-American culture in Liberia including Liberian Settler English and a unique form of antebellum architecture. Furthermore, Americo-Liberians contributed to the culinary cuisine of the region by introducing American baking techniques.

Americo-Liberian weddings follow the traditional African-American or Afro-Caribbean style weddings in which the bridegroom appears in a lounge suit and the bride in a white wedding dress. 

Many upper class and influential Americo-Liberians belonged to the Masonic Order of Liberia which was established in 1867 and based in the Grand Masonic Temple in Monrovia. Being a Mason was a veritable prerequisite for positions of political leadership in the True Whig Party. Following the 1980 Liberian coup, Samuel Doe outlawed Freemasonry before lifting the ban in 1987. The Masonic Temple was damaged during the First Liberian Civil War and remained unoccupied before being restored.

Education
The Americo-Liberians arrived with varying degrees of formal and informal education. Americo-Liberians established schools and also established the University of Liberia, formerly Liberia College, in addition to other higher learning institutions such as Cuttington College.

The Americo-Liberians were among the first sub-Saharan Africans to qualify as medical doctors and lawyers in the United States and prominent Americo-Liberian pioneers include Dr. Solomon Carter Fuller, a distinguished Harvard-educated Liberian psychiatrist and physician.

Several Americo-Liberians worked as teachers and taught both Americo-Liberian and Liberians from other ethnic groups. Americo-Liberians made a concerted effort to educate Liberians from other ethnic groups, including through the use of the ward system.

Religion
The Americo-Liberians are predominantly Protestant Christians and mainly belong to the Baptist, Methodist denominations although some Americo-Liberians are Episcopalians and perhaps a smaller minority adhere to the Catholic faith. Americo-Liberians introduced Protestant Christianity on a wider scale in the modern-day region of Liberia. Several Americo-Liberians served as missionaries to other ethnic groups in Liberia and were among the first Baptist, Methodist, and Episcopal missionaries of black African descent in Liberia.

Food
Americo-Liberian cuisine includes a variety of dishes and is a blend of African-American, Afro-Caribbean and local indigenous Liberian rice and foofoo dishes. Americo-Liberians introduced traditional African-American baking techniques into the modern-day nation of Liberia. Liberia remains unique for its baking traditions that are derived from the African-American immigrants to Liberia. Traditional Americo-Liberian cuisine includes African-American soul food such as cornbread, fried chicken, collard greens but also incorporated local African traditional dishes such as palm butter soup and rice.

Dress
Present-day Americo-Liberians, similar to other Liberians, wear both African and Western-style dress. Ethnic groups in Liberia had been accustomed to seeing European dress prior to the arrival of the Americo-Liberians, as a consequence of extensive trade with Europeans dating to the fifteenth and sixteenth centuries.

However, the ethnic groups who inhabited Liberia did not customarily wear Western-style dress, and it was the Americo-Liberians who popularized Western-style dress including the top hat, tailcoat, lounge suit and frock coat. Americo-Liberian women between the nineteenth and early twentieth centuries wore elaborate Victorian and Edwardian style American dresses that were fashionable among both the African-American and white American communities in the southern United States. Americo-Liberian men wore top hats, frock coats, and lounge suits in addition to spats.

Although Americo-Liberians would continue to wear elaborate style dress for special occasions such as weddings, parades, and the inauguration of presidents, they adapted their styles of dress to incorporate newer Western-style fashion and elaborate African-style dresses between the early to late twentieth centuries. In the modern era, although pioneered by the Americo-Liberians, Liberians, irrespective of ethnicity, wear both African and Western-style dress.

Language
Americo-Liberians speak Liberian English and its varieties such as Merico and Liberian Settler English, all of which have been influenced by African-American Vernacular English, Gullah, and Barbadian Creole. The Americo-Liberians introduced a form of African-American Vernacular English that influenced the existing pidgin English or patois that existed in the region of Liberia from the precolonial era. This form, called Standard Liberian English or Liberian Settler English, continues to be spoken by descendants of the original settlers today.

Architecture

Americo-Liberian architecture in the nineteenth and early twentieth centuries was a unique fusion of antebellum architecture from the United States blended into the African environment of Liberia. Americo-Liberian houses were a variation of different architectural styles from the American South and were built of weather-board or stone frame and had both verandahs.

Wealthier Americo-Liberians incorporated antebellum southern architecture that included neoclassical and the neo-Greco-Roman architecture of the antebellum southern plantation great houses into the houses that they built in Liberia. Antebellum southern architecture incorporated Georgian, Neoclassical, and Greek Revival styles that are also reflected in Americo-Liberian architecture of the nineteenth and early twentieth centuries.

Diaspora and legacy

Americo-Liberian diaspora
Following the 1980 Liberian coup d'état, the First Liberian Civil War and the Second Liberian Civil War, thousands of Americo-Liberians left the country while others were killed in the conflicts. The 1980 coup brought an end to the dominant political position that Americo-Liberians had held on Liberian society and resulted in influential Americo-Liberian individuals and families leaving the country through either being forced or voluntarily going into exile abroad. The higher socio-economic status of Americo-Liberians also enabled them to emigrate from the country more easily compared to other ethnic groups during times of conflict. In 1991, American President George H. W. Bush granted Liberians immigration protection in 1991 under “temporary protected status" during the first civil war. Americo-Liberians have settled predominantly in the United States in places such as Maryland, Minnesota, New York, Pennsylvania, as well as in smaller numbers in Canada and the United Kingdom. Some of the children of Americo-Liberian immigrants to the United States are known to identify themselves as African-American as opposed to Liberian and have adopted American accents and culture. Although the Americo-Liberian diaspora is extensive in the United States, there remains communities of Americo-Liberians in the larger Liberian cities and towns such as Monrovia, Crozerville, and Careysburg. In 2009, it was estimated that a population of 150,000 Americo-Liberians existed within the total Liberian population of 3.5 million people.

Americo-Liberian cultural legacy
While globalization has carried African-American culture around the world, Americo-Liberians reproduced their own cultural American continuity in Liberia. Its name means "land of the free", and it is considered the most American of African countries in terms of its political institutions.

The Liberian constitution, structure of government, and flag resemble those of the United States. The former residences of Americo-Liberian families were built in the style of antebellum plantation homes they may have admired in the American South. Their language continued to carry elements of African-American Vernacular English. By many accounts, Liberians easily integrate into African-American communities. Liberian immigrants to the United States have the highest passport acceptance rates and the longest extension rates of any citizens of African nations.

Although many of the upper-class Americo-Liberians left the country or were killed during the civil wars, and their houses and monuments crumbling, ordinary Liberians look to the United States for aid. In 2007, BET founder Robert Johnson called for "African Americans to support Liberia like Jewish Americans support Israel".

Notable Americo-Liberians
The Americo-Liberian or Congau ethnic group has produced several notable politicians, businessman, and professionals including:

Politicians
 Wilmot Collins, Liberian-born American politician serving as the mayor of Helena, Montana
 Nathaniel Barnes, Liberian businessman and politician
 Charles Cecil Dennis, Liberian diplomat and politician
 C. Cyvette M. Gibson, Mayor of Paynesville, Liberia
 Louis Arthur Grimes, Liberian jurist
 Richard Abrom Henries, Liberian politician
 Elijah Johnson, Liberian pioneer and founding father of Liberia
 James A. A. Pierre, Liberian politician
 Charles Taylor, Liberian President and convicted war criminal
 Hilary Teague, Liberian pioneer and author of the Liberian Declaration of Independence
 Frank E. Tolbert, Liberian politician and businessman
 E. Reginald Townsend, Liberian politician and journalist
 Winston Tubman, Liberian lawyer and politician
 Clarence Lorenzo Simpson Sr., Liberian politician and former Vice President
 Kimmie Weeks, Liberian human rights activist

Education and writers
 Edward Wilmot Blyden, Liberian intellectual scholar and Pan-Africanist pioneer
 Mary Antoinette Brown-Sherman, Liberian educator and first African woman to serve as president of a university
 Anna E. Cooper, educator, dean of the University of Liberia
 Helene Cooper, journalist for The New York Times
 John Payne Jackson, influential journalist in the Lagos Colony and founder of the Lagos Weekly Record
 Wayétu Moore, author

Business
 Romeo A. Horton, a founder of the Africa Development Bank
 Clarence Lorenzo Simpson Jr., Liberian judge and businessman
 Benoni Urey, Liberian businessman and the wealthiest Liberian
Rhoda Weeks-Brown, General counsel to the IMF

Science and medicine
 Solomon Carter Fuller, Liberian pioneer and African-American psychiatrist and physician

American-born presidents of Liberia
Americo-Liberians formed a cultural elite in Liberia. The following presidents of Liberia were born in the United States:
 Joseph Jenkins Roberts, first and seventh president. Born in Norfolk, Virginia
 Stephen Allen Benson, second president. Born in Cambridge, Dorchester County, Maryland
 Daniel Bashiel Warner, third president. Born in Baltimore County, Maryland
 James Spriggs-Payne, fourth and eighth president. Born in Richmond, Virginia
 Edward James Roye, fifth president. Born in Newark, Licking County, Ohio.
 James Skivring Smith, sixth president. Born in Charleston, South Carolina, Charleston County, South Carolina
 Anthony W. Gardiner, ninth president. Born in Southampton County, Virginia
 Alfred F. Russell, tenth president. Born in Lexington, Fayette County, Kentucky
 William D. Coleman, thirteenth president. Born in Fayette County, Kentucky
 Garretson W. Gibson, fourteenth president. Born in Baltimore, Maryland

Also one Americo-Liberian president of Liberia was born in the British West Indies:
 Arthur Barclay, the fifteenth president of Liberia, was born in Bridgetown, Barbados

All subsequent presidents were born in Liberia.

See also 

 Liberian nationality law
 History of Liberia
 Liberia
 Mississippi-in-Africa
 Martin Delany
 McGill family (Monrovia)
 Sierra Leone Creole people
Gold Coast Euro-Africans
 Atlantic Creole

References

Sources

External links 
https://web.archive.org/web/20070809123601/http://www.uniboa.org/migration.html

Americo-Liberian people
Creole peoples
Ethnic groups in Liberia
Repatriated Africans
African-American diaspora in Africa
Afro-Caribbean history
People of Liberated African descent
Peoples of the African-American diaspora